Trachylepis perrotetii, also known commonly as the African red-sided skink, the red-sided skink, and the Teita mabuya, is a species of lizard in the family Scincidae. The species is endemic to Africa.

Etymology
The specific name, perrotetii, is in honor of French naturalist George Samuel Perrottet.

Geographic range
T. perrotetii is found in Benin, Burkina Faso, Cameroon, Central African Republic, Chad, Democratic Republic of the Congo, The Gambia, Ghana, Guinea, Guinea-Bissau, Ivory Coast, Liberia, Mali, Mauritania, Niger, Nigeria, Senegal, Sierra Leone, Sudan, Togo, and Uganda.

Reproduction
T. perrotetii is oviparous.

References

Further reading
Duméril AMC, Bibron G (1839). Erpétologie générale ou Histoire naturelle complète des Reptiles. Tome cinquième [Volume 5]. Paris: Roret. viii + 854 pp. (Euprepes perrotetii, new species, pp. 669–670). (in French)
Spawls, Stephen; Howell, Kim; Hinkel, Harald; Menegon, Michele (2018). Field Guide to East African Reptiles, Second Edition. London: Bloomsbury Natural History. 624 pp. . (Trachylepis perrotetii, p. 144).
Trape J-F, Trape S, Chirio L (2012). Lézards, crocodiles et tortues d'Afrique occidentale et du Sahara. Paris: IRD Orstom. 503 pp. . (in French).

Trachylepis
Reptiles described in 1839
Taxa named by André Marie Constant Duméril
Taxa named by Gabriel Bibron